The women's 200 metres event at the 1986 European Athletics Championships was held in Stuttgart, then West Germany, at Neckarstadion on 28 and 29 August 1986.

Medalists

Results

Final
29 August
Wind: -0.8 m/s

Semi-finals
28 August

Semi-final 1
Wind: 0.5 m/s

Semi-final 2
Wind: 0.3 m/s

Heats
28 August

Heat 1
Wind: -2.0 m/s

Heat 2
Wind: -1.7 m/s

Heat 3
Wind: -1.1 m/s

Participation
According to an unofficial count, 17 athletes from 9 countries participated in the event.

 (3)
 (1)
 (3)
 (1)
 (1)
 (2)
 (1)
 (3)
 (2)

References

200 metres
200 metres at the European Athletics Championships
1986 in women's athletics